On 23 June 1999, a Virgin Trains electric express train from London Euston to Glasgow Central, hauled by Class 87 No 87027 Wolf of Badenoch, ran into an empty First North Western four-carriage Pacer unit, injuring 27 people. Eccles was awarded a medal for his prompt action, which averted a much more serious accident. The driver of the Pacer train helped passengers from the Glasgow Central train despite his injuries.

The Pacer had passed a signal at danger and run through a set of points, coming to a stand on the line on which the express was approaching. Its rear cab was destroyed in the crash along with a section of the passenger accommodation, and the coach bodies were displaced from their underframes. The incident report stated that the accident was most likely to have been human error of the Pacer driver as the investigation showed no faults with either the signalling system or the brakes of the Pacer train.

Due to the severe level of damage sustained by the Pacer train, the safety of the units were investigated as part of the inquiry into the accident.

References

Railway accidents and incidents in Cheshire
Railway accidents in 1999
Train collisions in England